The following is a timeline of the history of the city of Niamey, Niger.

20th century

 1902
 Village designated seat of administrative cercle of Djerma.
 French school opens.
 1922 - Administrative cercle of Niamey created.
 1926 - Seat of French colonial Colonie du Niger relocated to Niamey from Zinder "in order to facilitate trade with other French colonies along the Niger River."
 1931 - Jules Brevie Hospital established.
 1932 - Catholic church built.
 1937 - "Urban Development Plan" created.
 1942 - Roman Catholic diocese of Niamey established.
 1953
  newspaper begins publication.
 Archives Nationales du Niger headquartered in Niamey.
 1956 - Djibo Bakary becomes mayor.
 1958 - Radio Niger begins broadcasting.
 1959

 December: Musée National du Niger (museum) opens.
 1960 - City becomes part of newly independent Republic of Niger.
 1961 -  newspaper begins publication.
 1962
 Lycée La Fontaine (school) established.
 Population: 40,000 (estimate).
 1964 - Télé Sahel (television) begins broadcasting.
 1965
 13 April: President Diori attacked.
 Centre Culturel Franco-Nigérien inaugurated.
 1967 - Office of Radio and Television of Niger headquartered in Niamey.
 1968 - Société des Mines de l'Air headquartered in city.
 1970s - Grand Mosque of Niamey built.
 1970
 Kennedy Bridge opens.
 Agence de Cooperation Culturelle et Technique headquartered in city.
 1971 - Centre d'Enseignement Superieur (college) founded.
 1972 - Airport opens.
 1973
 University of Niamey active.
 Tillabéri-Niamey road constructed.
 1974
  and  newspapers in publication.
 Olympic FC de Niamey (football club) formed.
 Telephone ministry headquarters built.
 1977 - Population: 225,314.
 1982
 30 March: Central Market burns down.
 Niamey Literacy Center built.
 American International School of Niamey built.
 1984 - Urban development plan created.
 1985 - Court of Appeals building constructed.
 1986 - Niamey Grand Market built.
 1988 - Population: 397,437.
 1989
 City becomes the "Niamey Urban Community," containing administrative Commune I, Commune II, and Commune III.
 Stade Général-Seyni-Kountché (stadium) opens.
 1990 - February: Student economic protest; crackdown.
 1991 - Le Républicain newspaper begins publication.
 1996
 27 January: 1996 Nigerien coup d'état occurs.
 Sociéte Nigerienne de Transports de Voyageurs headquartered in city.
 1997 - United Nations Economic Commission for Africa Subregional Development Centre for West Africa headquartered in Niamey.
 1998 - Nigerien hip hop musical style develops in Niamey.
 1999 - 9 April: President Maïnassara assassinated.

21st century
 2001 - Population: 707,951.
 2002
 August: Military mutiny; crackdown.
 Administration of Niamey Urban Community reorganized into Commune I, Commune II,  Commune III, Commune IV, and Commune V.
 2005 - 2005 Jeux de la Francophonie sport/cultural event held in Niamey.
 2006
 June: 2006 Abdou Moumouni University protests.
  headquartered in city.
 2007 - Dounia TV begins broadcasting.
 2009 - Population: 943,055 (estimate).
 2010
 18 February: 2010 Nigerien coup d'état occurs.
 August: 2010 West African floods.
 2011
 Oumarou Dogari Moumouni becomes mayor of the Niamey Urban Community.
 Kandadji Dam construction begins 180 km from Niamey; when completed will increase city power supply. 
 2012
 August: Flood.
 Population: 1,026,848.
 2013
 United States military drone base begins operating at airport.
 December: Economic protest.
 Assane Seydou becomes mayor of the Niamey Urban Community.
 2014 - Niamey railway station opens.
 2015 - 17–18 January: Protest against Parisian satirical publication Charlie Hebdo issue No. 1178.
 2017 - August: Flood.
 2021 - Coup attempt.

Images

See also
 Niamey history (de)

References

This article incorporates information from the French Wikipedia and German Wikipedia.

Bibliography

in English

in French

External links

  (Bibliography of open access  articles)
  (Images, etc.)
  (Images, etc.)
  (Bibliography)
  (Bibliography)
  (Bibliography)
  (Bibliography)
 Index to scientific research related to Niamey, via Institut de recherche pour le développement of France, Centre de documentation de Niamey 
 

Niamey
 
Years in Niger
Niger-related lists
Niamey